Mansehra Shiv Temple is one of the oldest Hindu temple in Pakistan that is still in existence. The temple is at least 2000 to 3000 years old. The temple is situated in Chitti Gatti, 15 kilometres from Mansehra in Khyber Pakhtunkhwa in Pakistan. The annual Shivarathri festival in the temple is visited by people all around Pakistan and from abroad.

History
According to the archaeological research there existed Hindu temples on the site where now the temple stands and the ancient Shiva Lingam inside the temple is very ancient and is at least 2000 years old. The temple was restored in the 1830s by the Raja of Jammu as an act of devotion. During the 1947–48, the temple was forcibly seized by some people and started occupying illegally. They also sealed up the temple on this site.

From 1948 to 2008, the temple remained sealed and abandoned. The temple remained inaccessible to the Hindus till 1998. In 1998, Hindus reclaimed the temple. After that, the temple has been partially restored by the Pakistani Hindus.

Gallery

See also
Churrio Jabal Durga Mata Temple
Hinduism in Pakistan
 Shiv temple, Hyderabad
 Hinduism in Khyber Pakhtunkhwa

References

Hindu temples
Temples in Pakistan
Hindu temples in Khyber Pakhtunkhwa